The American Swimming Coaches Association, or ASCA, is a professional organization for Swimming coaches in the USA. It was founded in 1958 and is based in Fort Lauderdale, Florida.

ASCA provides education opportunities for swimming coaches, including running and participating at clinics both within and outside the USA.

Honors and awards

Hall of Fame
ASCA annually inducts selected coaches into its own Hall of Fame, as part of the annual ASCA World Clinic. Members of the ASCA Hall of Fame (and year of induction) are:

Dave Armbruster (pre-2003)
Buddy Baarcke (2016)
Bill Bachrach (pre-2003)
Ron Ballatore (2009)
Peter Banks (2015)
Red Barr (pre-2003)
Jack Bauerle (2010)
Dave Beaver (pre-2003)
Paul Blair (2008)
George Block (2011)
Ernst Brandsten (pre-2003)
Stan Brauninger (pre-2003)
George Breen (2016)
Bob Bowman (2010)
Steve Bultman (2015)
Harry Burke (pre-2003)
Frank Busch (2008)
Ray Bussard (2008)
Fred Cady (pre-2003)
Dades Center (pre-2003)
Sherm Chavoor (pre-2003)
Jim Clark (pre-2003)
Jack Cody (pre-2003)
John Collins (2006)
Doc Counsilman (pre-2003)
Peter Daland (pre-2003)
Chris Davis (2015)

Ray Daughters (pre-2003)
Don Easterling (2004)
Earl Ellis (2011)
Jim Ellis (2019)
Frank Elm (2004)
Ray Essick (2015)
Richard Fetters (2014)
Jay Fitzgerald (2012)
Jean Freeman (2011)
Johnny Galvich (pre-2003)
Don Gambril (pre-2003)
Bob Gillett (2009)
Bob Groseth (2013)
George Haines (pre-2003)
L. Deb. Handley (pre-2003)
Dick Hannula (2004)
Jerry Holtrey (2010)
Karen Moe Humphreys (2012)
Richard Jochums (2004)
Frank Keefe (2005)
Skip Kenney (2005)
Don LaMont (2008)
Gene Lee (pre-2003)
John Leonard (2015)
Peter Malone (2009)
Matt Mann (pre-2003)
David Marsh (2010)

John Mattos (2019)
Bud McAllister (2007)
Kathy McKee (2019)
Teri McKeever (2014)
Charlie McCaffrey (pre-2003)
George McMillion (2005)
Bob Miller (2011)
Harold Minto (pre-2003)
Jim Montrella (2005)
Phil Moriarty (2009)
Pete Morgan (2014)
Pete Motekaitis (2018)
Jack Nelson (2009)
Richard Papenguth (pre-2003)
Mike Parratto (2019)
Bill Peak (2007)
Mike Peppe (pre-2003)
Clarence Pinkston (pre-2003)
Dennis Pursley (2006)
Richard Quick (2003)
Eddie Reese (2003)
Randy Reese (2003)
Jack Ridley (2012)
Chuck Riggs (2018)
Jim Riley Sr. (pre-2003)
Tom Robinson (pre-2003)
Bill Rose (2004)

Dave Salo (2010)
Soichi Sakamoto (pre-2003)
Charles Sava (pre-2003)
Walt Schlueter (pre-2003)
Mark Schubert (2003)
Maureen Sheehan (2019)
Dick Shoulberg (2009)
Charles Silvia (pre-2003)
Jack Simon (2007)
Ed Solotar (2005)
Don Sonia (2012)
Ed Spencer (2018)
Mary Freeman Kelly Spitzer (2008)
Gus Stager (pre-2003)
Bob Steele (2016)
Murray Stephens (2006)
Don Swartz (2013)
Penny Taylor (2013)
Nort Thornton Sr. (pre-2003)
Nort Thornton Jr. (2003)
Stan Tinkham (pre-2003)
Gregg Troy (2012)
Jon Urbanchek (2004)
Gregg Wilson (2018)
Jim Wood (2011)
Ray Woods (2016)

Coach of the Year
Beginning in 1961, ASCA has annually award a Coach of the Year honor to "the individual whose coaching effective has contributed most toward American swimming excellence" on the international level. Beginning in 2015, the award was re-named the George Haines Coach of the Year award.

References

Swimming in the United States
Swimming organizations
1958 establishments in Florida
American companies established in 1958
Sports organizations established in 1958